, commonly written as 東邦ガス, is a Japanese gas company based in Nagoya, Japan. It supplies gas to the Tōkai region, especially the Chūkyō metropolitan area. It is also one of Nagoya's "four influential companies" along with Meitetsu, Matsuzakaya, and Chubu Electric Power.

History 
Toho Gas was initially founded to the Toho Electric Power Company (東邦電力) in 1922, as a result of the merger of two electric power companies, Kansai Denki and Kyushu Dentō Tetsudō. Following the merger, the company decided to spin off the gas business and acquisition of the Nagoya Gas Corporation.

Timeline
June 26, 1922, Toho Gas was founded by acquiring business of Nagoya Gas.
March 1927, Toho Gas acquired business of Saibu Gas Group in Fukuoka.
December 1930, The gas business in the Northern Kyushu region was transferred to Saibu Gas Corporation.
April 2003, Toho Gas merged with Gōdō Gas, Gifu Gas Corporation, and Ōgaki Gas.

Affiliates
Toho Gas Customer Service Company Limited
Mizushima Gas Company Limited in Kurashiki, Okayama Prefecture
Toho Gas Techno Company Limited
Toho Liquefied Gas Company Limited

References

External links 
Toho Gas website (Japanese)
Toho Gas website (English)

Companies listed on the Tokyo Stock Exchange
Companies listed on the Osaka Exchange
Companies based in Nagoya
Natural gas companies of Japan